Muara Bungo is a town in the Indonesian province of Jambi, Sumatra. It is the capital of Bungo Regency, a regency (kabupaten) in Sumatra. It had a population of 21,243 as of the 2020 census.

Geography

Waterways

Climate
Muara Bungo has a tropical rainforest climate (Af) with heavy rainfall year-round.

Infrastructure

Transportation
The Muara Bungo Airport is located in Muara Bungo, and began operations in November 2012. A roadway connects Muara Bungo with Jambi City and Palembang. In 1977, the Sawahtambang-Muara Bungo highway was under construction.

Emergency services
Muara Bungo has a fire department that is equipped with fire trucks. The fire department responds to building fires and fires on agricultural and vacant lands. In May 2015, it was reported that fires in Muara Bungo during 2015 had caused Rp $3 billion in losses and damages, which is approximately US$223,957. The damage estimate was mostly attributed to building fires. Muara Bungo also has a police department.

Business and commerce
A branch of Bank Rakyat Indonesia is located in Muara Bungo.

Land use
Natural rubber is produced in Muara Bungo, and rubber farming is a primary source of income and livelihood for the majority of the city's residents. An agroforestry innovation involved the planting of rubber trees and cinnamon alongside one-another to diversify plantings to avoid monoculture. Muara Bungo has some large oil palm plantations, and palm oil is produced there. Circa 1995 to 1996, illegal timber harvesting was observed in Muara Bungo.

Schools
The University of Muara Bungo is located in the city.

Crime
In June 2015, it was reported that street crime rates were increasing in Muara Bungo. Crimes have included mugging (theft by violence), auto theft and robberies. It was reported by Tribun Jambi that a majority of the crimes were committed by outsiders who do not reside in Muara Bungo.

References

Further reading

 Zajuli, M. Heri Hermiyanto, and H. Panggabean. "Depositional Environment of Fine-Grained Sedimentary Rocks of the Sinamar Formation, Muara Bungo, Jambi". Indonesian Journal on Geoscience 8.1 (2013): 25–38. 
 "Ore and Alteration Mineralogy of Muara Bungo Gold Prospect, Jambi Province: Implication for Deposits Genesis". Proceedings of International Conference on Georesources and Geological Engineering, Yogyakarta. December 2013.
 
 Sibuea, T. Herdimansyah Th. 1993. "The variety of Mammal species in the agroforest areas of Krui (Lampung), Muara Bungo (Jambi) and Maninjau (West Sumatra)". Final research report, Orstom and Himbio.

Populated places in Jambi
Regency seats of Jambi